Raj Mehra 20 May 1913  1993), was an Indian character artist and film actor in Hindi language films, especially known for his role as a father of leading actors. During his career, he worked in over 300 Hindi films. Some of his popular roles are those of the father of Raj Kapoor in Sharada and Police Superintendent in Jis Desh Men Ganga Behti Hai.

Career
He started his career with Shaheed Latif's Shikayat (1948). Aasoo Bane Angaarey (1993) was his last film he acted in.

Filmography

Awards
Filmfare Awards 1958

References

External links
 

1913 births
1993 deaths
Indian male film actors
Male actors in Hindi cinema
20th-century Indian male actors
Filmfare Awards winners
Date of death unknown